Carlos Jericho "Icot" Loreto Petilla is a Filipino politician. He ran as a senator in the Philippines under the Liberal Party (LP) during the 2016 General Elections in the Philippines. He is also a former Secretary of the Department of Energy (DOE) of the Philippines. He is currently serving as Governor of the Province of Leyte since 2022 and previously from 2004 to 2012 before joining the cabinet of President Benigno Aquino III.

Early life
Petilla finished his Bachelor of Science in Management Engineering at the Ateneo. He also attended the same school during his high school days. After finishing college, Petilla became a college instructor and taught Computer Programming subjects in Ateneo de Manila University for five years. He also became an IT consultant to various multinational companies.

His business interests included the International Data Conversion Solution Inc. based in Mandaluyong and Accudata, Inc. based in Tacloban City where he is both President and Chief Executive Officer (CEO). He is likewise the part-owner and consultant of Direct Data Capture with business offices in the United Kingdom and New York and Datahold in London, UK.

Political career
During the 2004 election campaign, he divested his shares in his private investments to make a run as a governor of Leyte, even challenging a more popular bet in the person of three-term Representative and now Presidential Legal Adviser Sergio Apostol. He won during that year's election.

His first 100 days of office saw the drafting of the implementing Rules and Regulations of the Leyte Province Investment Code of 2004. The code aims to encourage investors to locate in Leyte with the salient feature of getting a 100% real property tax holiday for 5 years.

Petilla also supported The Philippine Economic Zone Authority in approving the application of the Province of Leyte to convert the 6.9 hectares lot at Barangay Pawing, Palo, Leyte, where the developed and ready for operation Leyte Academic Center is located, into the Leyte Information Communication Technology Park.

Election, 2007
Petilla accepted the nomination of the ruling Lakas-CMD party as one of its candidates for Senator under the Team Unity umbrella in the May 14, 2007 Philippine midterm elections. However, only days after he filed his candidacy for the Senate, he withdrew his name from the list of Team Unity candidates, with Boholano actor Cesar Montano acting as his replacement in the slate.

Election, 2016
In June 2015, he stepped down as DOE secretary to prepare for his senatorial bid. He ran for Senator under the Daang Matuwid Coalition led by Liberal Party (LP). His senatorial campaign centers on his three major advocacies: Energy, Education and Health. He failed to win a Senate seat, placing 18th out of 50 candidates, with around 6.3 million votes.

Personal life
Petilla is the son of former Leyte Governors Leopoldo E. Petilla (1992–1995) and Remedios "Matin" Petilla (1995–2004). He is married to Frances Ann Regis Basilio, former mayor of Palo, Leyte from 2019 until 2022, and they have five children. His brother, Leopoldo Dominico "Mic" Petilla, was a governor from 2013 until 2022.

References

|-

|-

Living people
Secretaries of Energy of the Philippines
Governors of Leyte (province)
Nationalist People's Coalition politicians
Lakas–CMD (1991) politicians
Lakas–CMD politicians
People from Leyte (province)
PDP–Laban politicians
Ateneo de Manila University alumni
Academic staff of Ateneo de Manila University
Benigno Aquino III administration cabinet members
Year of birth missing (living people)